Boda is a locality situated in Rättvik Municipality, Dalarna County, Sweden with 541 inhabitants in 2010.

The Styggforsen waterfall is located within this region.

References 

Populated places in Dalarna County
Populated places in Rättvik Municipality